Chandrala may refer to:

Chandrala, Gudlavalleru mandal, a village in Gudlavalleru mandal of Krishna district, Andhra Pradesh, India
Chandrala, Mylavaram mandal, a village in Mylavaram mandal of Krishna district, Andhra Pradesh, India
Chandrala, Gujarat, a village in Gandhinagar taluk of Gandhinagar district, Gujarat, India